Ye Wan-yong (17 July 1858 – 12 February 1926), also spelled Yi Wan-yong or Lee Wan-yong, was a Korean politician who served as the 7th Prime Minister of Korea. He was pro-Japanese and is best remembered for signing the Japan–Korea Annexation Treaty, which placed Korea under Japanese rule in 1910.

Early life and education
Ye Wan-yong was born into the Ubong Yi clan (우봉 이씨, 牛峰李氏) to a poor aristocrat family in 1858, but grew up with a lot of support after he became the adoptive son of Ye Ho-jun, who was a friend of Heungseon Daewongun and an in-law. He learned English and theology at Yookyoung Park, went to the United States to live as a diplomat, and returned to Korea to serve as a pro-Russian politician until the 1896 Agwan Pacheon incident, where King Gojong and his crown prince took refuge at the Russian legation in Seoul. As Japan grew stronger, he became a pro-Japanese politician.

Ye was a founding member of the Independence Club established in 1896 and belonged to the "reform faction" which wanted to Westernize Korea and to open the country to foreign trade.

Career
Ye was a prominent government minister at the time of Eulsa Treaty of 1905, and was the most outspoken supporter of the pact which made the Korean Empire a protectorate of the Empire of Japan, thus stripping it of its diplomatic sovereignty. The treaty was signed in defiance of Korean Emperor Gojong, and he is thus accounted to be the chief of five ministers (including Park Jae-soon, Lee Ji-yong, Lee Geun-taek, Gwon Joong-hyun) who were later denounced as Five Eulsa Traitors in Korea.

Under Japanese Resident-General Itō Hirobumi, Ye was promoted to the post of prime minister from 1906 to 1910. Ye was instrumental in forcing Emperor Gojong to abdicate in 1907, after Emperor Gojong tried to publicly denounce the Eulsa Treaty at the second international Hague Peace Convention. In 1907 Ye was also chief amongst the seven ministers who supported the Japan–Korea Treaty of 1907, which further placed the domestic affairs of Korea under Japan's control, thus completing the colonialisation of Korea by Japan. Ye is therefore also listed in Korea amongst the Seven Jeongmi Traitors. In 1909, he was seriously injured in an assassination attempt by the "Five Eulsa Traitors Assassination Group".

Japanese rule

In 1910, Ye signed the Japan-Korea Annexation Treaty by which Japan took full control over Korea, while Korean Emperor Sunjong refused to sign. For his cooperation with the Japanese, Ye is also listed in Korea amongst the eight Gyeongsul Traitors. He was rewarded with a peerage in the Japanese kazoku system, becoming a hakushaku (Count), in 1910, which was raised to the title of kōshaku (Marquis) in 1921. He died in 1926.

Legacy
After the independence of Korea at the end of World War II, the grave of Ye was dug up and his remains suffered the posthumous dismemberment, which is often considered to be the most disgraceful punishment in Confucian ideology. Ye's name has become a byword for "traitor" in contemporary South Korea.

However, Seo Jae-pil's Dongnip Sinmun (Independence Newspaper) never wrote a single line of criticism against him.

The South Korean Special law to redeem pro-Japanese collaborators' property was enacted in 2005 and the committee confiscated the property of the descendants of nine people that had collaborated with Japan when Korea was annexed by Japan in August 1910. Ye is one of those heading the list.

Family 
 Great-Great-Great-Great-Great-Great-Great-Grandfather
 Ye Yu-gyeong (이유경, 李有敬) (1586 - 1663)
 Great-Great-Great-Great-Great-Great-Grandfather
 Ye Heub (이흡, 李翖) (? - 1637)
 Great-Great-Great-Great-Great-Great-Grandmother 
 Lady Oh of the Dongbok Oh clan (동복 오씨, 同福 吳氏) (? - 1637); daughter of Oh Baek-ryeong (오백령, 吳百齡; 1560 - 1633)
 Great-Great-Great-Great-Great-Grandfather
 Ye Man-seong (이만성, 李晩成) (1659 - 1722)
 Great-Great-Great-Great-Great-Grandmother
 Lady Kim of the Andong Kim clan (안동 김씨, 安東 金氏[新]) (1659 - 1703); daughter of Kim Su-heung (김수흥, 金壽興; 1626 - 1690)
 Great-Great-Great-Great-Grandfather
 Ye Gu (이구, 李絿) (1688 - ?)
 Great-Great-Great-Great-Grandmother
 Lady Jeong of the Dongrae Jeong clan (동래 정씨, 東萊 鄭氏)
 Great-Great-Great-Grandfather
 Ye Myeong-bin (이명빈, 李命彬)
 Great-Great-Grandfather
 Ye Roe (이뢰, 李耒) (1733 - 1756)
 Great-Great-Grandmother
 Lady Yun of the Haepyeong Yun clan (해평 윤씨, 海平 尹氏) (1732 - 1809)
 Great-Grandfather
 Ye Gwang-yeob (이광엽, 李光燁)
 Adoptive Great-Grandfather - Ye Gwang-yu (이광유, 李光裕) (1761 - 1800)
 Adoptive Great-Grandmother - Lady Kim of the Andong Kim clan (안동 김씨, 安東 金氏); daughter of Kim Yi-in (김이인, 金履仁)
 Grandfather
 Ye Gyu (이규,李圭)
 Adoptive Grandfather - Yi Sik (이식, 李埴) (1777 - ?)
 Adoptive Grandmother - Lady Hwang of the Changwon Hwang clan (창원 황씨, 昌原 黃氏); daughter of Hwang In-do (황인도, 黃仁燾; 1740 - ?)
 Father
 Ye Ho-seok (이호석, 李鎬奭) or Ye Seok-jun (이석준, 李奭俊)
 Adoptive father - Ye Hyo-jun (이호준, 李鎬俊) (1821 - 1901)
 Mother
 Lady Shin (신씨, 辛氏) (? - 1893)
 Adoptive mother - Lady Min of the Yeoheung Min clan (여흥 민씨, 驪興 閔氏); daughter of Min Yong-hyeon (민용현, 閔龍顯; 1786 - ?)
 Sibling(s)
 Older brother - Ye Myeong-yong (이면용, 李冕用) (1843 - ?)
 Nephew - Ye Hak-gu (이학구, 李鶴九) (1862 - ?)
 Nephew - Ye In-gu (이인구, 李麟九) (1867 - ?)
 Wive and children
 Lady Jo of the Yangju Jo clan (양주 조씨, 楊州 趙氏); daughter of Jo Byeong-ik (조병익, 趙秉翼)
 Son - Ye Seung-gu (이승구, 李升九)
 Daughter-in-law - Im Geon-gu (임건구, 任乾九) of the Pungcheon Im clan (풍천 임씨, 豊川 任氏)
 Adoptive Grandson - Ye Byeong-gil (이병길, 李丙吉) (12 January 1905 - 29 July 1950)
 Adoptive Granddaughter-in-law - Yi Byeong-jeon (이병전, 李丙田) of the Jeonju Yi clan (전주 이씨, 全州 李氏)
 Adoptive Great-Grandson - Ye Yun-hyeong (이윤형, 李允衡)
 Son - Ye Hang-gu (이항구, 李恒九) (1881 - 1945)
 Daughter-in-law - Kim Jin-gu (김진구, 金鎭九) (? - 1933)
 Grandson - Ye Byeong-gil (이병길, 李丙吉)
 Grandson - Ye Byeong-hui (이병희, 李丙喜)
 Grandson - Ye Byeong-ju (이병주, 李丙周) (1913 - ?)
 Great-Grandson - Ye Seok-hyeong (이석형)
 Grandson - Ye Byeong-cheol (이병철, 李丙喆) 
 Granddaughter - Ye Byeong-oh (이병오, 李丙吾), Lady Ye of the Ubong Ye clan 
 Unnamed daughter; died young

In popular culture
 Ye is portrayed by Woo Sang-jeon in the 2015 film Assassination.
 Lee Wan-ik is a fictional pro-Japanese Korean Minister that resembles Ye in name and action, are characters in the South Korean television series Mr. Sunshine.

References

1858 births
1926 deaths
People from Seongnam
Kazoku
Korean collaborators with Imperial Japan
Korean politicians
19th-century Korean people
20th-century Korean people
Traitors in history
Officials of the Korean Empire
Politicians of the Korean Empire
Joseon Kazoku